Anton Freiherr von Petz (born 21 January 1819 in Venitze, Transylvania – 7 May 1885 in Trieste) was an Austrian Navy officer. He served in the Imperial and Royal Navy, attaining the rank of Viceadmiral. He was created Knight of the Military Order of Maria Theresa.

He had a notable role during the Battle of Lissa in 1866, commanding the 2nd Division, which consisted of unarmored ships. Later, in 1869, he undertook an expedition to the Far East and South America.

Bibliography 
 Christian Ortner: Der Seekrieg in der Adria 1866, in: Viribus Unitis, Jahresbericht 2010 des Heeresgeschichtlichen Museums. Wien 2011, S. 100–124,  
  
 Bayer v. Bayersburg, Heinrich, Österreichs Admirale, 2 Bde., Wien 1960/62

References 

1819 births
1885 deaths
Austrian nobility
Austro-Hungarian Navy officers